A seeder is a stamp-type leatherworking tool used in leather carving.  It is predominantly used in floral designs to represent the seeds in the center of a flower, hence the name. Similar to other stamp-type tools, it is held vertically over the leather and struck with a wooden or rawhide mallet to create an impression in the surface of the leather. The seeder creates a small circular impression, often similar to an asterisk with a hole in the center.

References 

Leather crafting